Peter Creedon is a Gaelic football manager. He is originally from Rosscarbery, County Cork. He has managed two county teams: Tipperary and Laois.

Early life
Creedon worked as the principal of St Ailbe's School in Tipperary Town and lives in Thurles. He is a former coach of the Cahir senior football team and of his former local team Roscarbery, and was in charge of the Tipperary minor and under-21 football teams from 2003 to 2008.

Tipperary
Creedon managed the Tipperary senior football team, appointed on 28 March 2012 before leaving in July 2015. He took over from John Evans, who resigned on 18 March after Tipperary's defeat to Sligo in the Allianz League.

After Kerry defeated Tipp in the 2013 Championship Creedon called for the introduction of an All-Ireland 'B' Championship.

He left the Tipperary job in July 2015 due to time constraints as he had become school principal of Coláiste Dún Iascaigh in Cahir.

Laois
In September 2016, Creedon took over as the manager of the Laois senior football team on a two-year contract. In July 2017, Creedon stepped down as Laois manager after one year in charge.

Since
In October 2018, he was appointed manager of the Tipperary minor team. In October 2021, he was appointed manager of the Tipperary ladies'.

References

Year of birth missing (living people)
Living people
Carbery Rangers Gaelic footballers
Gaelic football managers
Gaelic games players from County Cork
Heads of schools in Ireland
Ladies' Gaelic football managers
People from Rosscarbery